Marlon E. Kimpson is an American politician and attorney who serves as a member of the South Carolina Senate, representing the 42nd district.

Kimpson attended Morehouse College, graduating in 1991, and the University of South Carolina School of Law, graduating in 1999. In additional to his role as a state senator, he is also a lawyer at Motley Rice.

Kimpson won a special election to succeed Robert Ford in 2013.

In January 2020, Kimpson announced his support for the Joe Biden Presidential Campaign in the competition for the Democratic Presidential nomination. Kimpson was selected as one of seventeen speakers to jointly deliver the keynote address at the 2020 Democratic National Convention.

On March 10, 2023, President Biden published his intent to appoint Kimpson and thirteen others as members to the Advisory Committee for Trade Policy and Negotiations, a Committee established by the Office of the US Trade Representative, part of the Executive Office of the President. Kimpson announced that he would vacate his South Carolina Senate seat later this year to take up the appointment.

References

External links

 Marlon Kimpson Senate page at South Carolina Legislature

21st-century American politicians
Living people
Morehouse College alumni
Democratic Party South Carolina state senators
University of South Carolina School of Law alumni
1969 births

Office of the United States Trade Representative